is a Japanese football player. She plays for INAC Kobe Leonessa and Japan national team.

Club career
Miyake was born in Sapporo on October 13, 1995. After playing JFA Academy Fukushima, she joined INAC Kobe Leonessa in 2013.

National team career
In 2011, Miyake was part of the Japan U-16 team that won the 2011 AFC U-16 Championship. In 2012, she represented Japan U-17 team at the 2012 U-17 World Cup. On September 11, 2013, she received her first senior team call-up. On September 22, she made her debut in a 2–0 win over Nigeria. In 2018, she played at 2018 Asian Cup and Japan won the championship. She played 17 games for Japan.

National team statistics
.

Honours

Club
INAC Kobe Leonessa
 Nadeshiko League: 2013
 Empress's Cup: 2015, 2016
 Nadeshiko League Cup: 2013

International
 AFC U-16 Women's Championship: 2011

References

External links

Shiori Miyake at Japan Football Association
Shiori Miyake at INAC Kobe Leonessa

1995 births
Living people
Sportspeople from Sapporo
Association football people from Hokkaido
Japanese women's footballers
Japan women's international footballers
Nadeshiko League players
INAC Kobe Leonessa players
Women's association football defenders
Footballers at the 2018 Asian Games
Asian Games gold medalists for Japan
Asian Games medalists in football
Medalists at the 2018 Asian Games
2019 FIFA Women's World Cup players
Footballers at the 2020 Summer Olympics
Olympic footballers of Japan